Guinness is a surname. Notable persons so named include:

 Alec Guinness (1914–2000), British actor
 Arthur Guinness (1725–1803), founder of Guinness beer
 Arthur Guinness (New Zealand politician) (1846–1913)
 Bunny Guinness, landscape architect and broadcaster
 Daphne Guinness (born 1967), artist 
 Desmond Guinness (1931–2020), Irish writer on Georgian art and architecture
 Humphrey Patrick Guinness (1902–1986), British polo player
 Jasmine Guinness (born 1976), model and designer
 Kenelm Lee Guinness (1887–1937), racing driver and spark plug manufacturer
 Matthew Guinness (born 1940), British actor
 Oonagh Guinness (1910–1995), Anglo-Irish socialite and society hostess
 Os Guinness (born 1941), author
 Peter Guinness (disambiguation), multiple people

See also
 Guinness family, prominent descendants of Arthur Guinness (1725–1803) and his brother Samuel Guinness (1727–1795)
 Magennis

English-language surnames
Surnames of Irish origin